GM Buffalo bus was the slang term for several models of intercity motorcoaches built by the GM Truck and Coach Division at Pontiac, Michigan, between 1966 and 1980.  "Buffalo" coaches have a stepped roof in front, and the first three rows of seats are at different levels, mounted on stepped floors similar to some theatre seating.

History

Predecessors

Scenicruiser

The GM "Buffalo" bus models were strongly influenced by the PD-4501 Scenicruiser, a model GM manufactured exclusively for Greyhound Lines between 1954 and 1956.

The Scenicruiser was a parlor bus intended for long-distance service with two levels: a lower level at the front containing the driving console and 10 seats behind it, and an upper level containing seating for 33. This allowed for a huge baggage compartment beneath the raised upper level, and also provided a 360-degree view for upper level passengers. A lavatory was located at the rear of the first level. Scenicruisers were equipped with air-ride suspension which utilized an air bag at each wheel, and were air-conditioned.

GM parlor buses
Contemporaneous with the Greyhound-exclusive Scenicruisers, GM manufactured the single-deck "Highway Traveler" (PD-4104) parlor from 1953 to 1960, pioneering the monocoque structure, air suspension, and slanted side windows that would go on to be used on the well-known New Look transit buses. Later, an updated Traveler (internally designated as model PD-4106 at GM, built 1961–65) incorporated some design updates, including the air-conditioning unit drive (now powered from an engine-mounted compressor), a V-drive engine-transmission connection, and the Detroit Diesel 6V71 or 8V71 engine.

Fishbowl transit and suburbans

The GM New Look Transit Coach series (nicknamed "fishbowl" for the six-piece rounded windshield) was introduced in 1959. In the early 1960s and later, thousands were built in the transit and suburban bus models. When designed and put into production, the Buffalo intercity products shared many body and mechanical parts with these "fishbowl" buses, which were assembled in the same plant in Pontiac, Michigan.

This aspect, a sensible production economy at first, would have a negative impact on the future of the Buffalo models years later when GM switched transit production at the Pontiac plant to the modular RTS design, a radical change beginning in the late 1970s.

Buffalo development
As Scenicruisers became a familiar sight on roads around the United States and in advertisements, competing bus companies including members of the National Trailways Bus System sought a vehicle to compete with it. One of the product designs developed in response to this market demand was the GM "Buffalo" bus, nick-named for the hump-back style of the roofline. Many features such as the split-level design from the Scenicruiser and the revisions introduced in the PD-4106 model were included in the Buffalo bus.

Unlike the Scenicruiser, the Buffalo buses were available for sale to all operators. In fact, Greyhound eventually purchased a few of them; the last GM bus purchased by Greyhound was a 1967 PD-4107.

Models

First generation: GM PD-4107 and PD-4903

In 1966, GM introduced the PD-4107. Also known informally as "decks", these buses were similar in some ways to the Scenicruiser design, but had a larger "second level" with the first level reduced, and the lavatory was located at the rear. The PD-4903 was the first GM bus to use a 24 volt electrical system and was equipped with a third luggage bay.

In the "Buffalo" bus, the driver sat higher than in the Scenicruiser, but the passenger compartment was no higher than the Scenicruiser's upper deck, so the Buffalo was not actually a double decker.  The difference in the height of the front and rear roof was approximately one foot, giving a sleeker, more aerodynamic shape.

These product lines used an airplane-like stressed-skin construction in which an aluminum riveted skin supports the weight of the bus, while a rigid wooden floor platform kept the buses structural shape. The engine cradle was hung off the back framing of the roof.

GM's Buffalo models were powered by supercharged eight cylinder Detroit Diesel Series 71 two-cycle diesel engines, known as the 8V71N. GM buses used a unique "V-drive" configuration with a transverse mounted engine. The transmission was set off at a 63° angle to connect to the rear axle. The left hand rotating engines were canted backwards for maintenance access; in fact the only major components not accessible from outside the bus were the right-hand exhaust manifold and the starter, which were accessible from underneath and via access panels under the rear passenger seat. The entire engine–transmission–radiator assembly was mounted on a cradle which could quickly be removed and replaced for maintenance, allowing the bus to rapidly return to revenue service while leaving the powertrain in the shop for repairs.

The original buses had a 4-speed non-synchronized Spicer manual transmission with a solenoid reverse. The manual transmission 4107 and 4903 models were notorious for being difficult to shift through the gears, often making loud, grinding noises that tended to upset the passengers. The technique known as "double-clutching" reduced these embarrassing noises, but even the most skilled driver would occasionally have problems, especially when changing buses (and/or powertrains) gave them an unfamiliar feel to clutch and shifter.

Second generation: GM PD-4108 and PD-4905
In 1970, design improvements came with the updated versions, PD-4108 (35 ft) and PD-4905 (40 ft) both with a 24-volt electrical system. The driver's controls were updated for both. The biggest complaint about the 4905 and 4903, from the drivers' point of view, was that the extra  of length was all between the front and rear axles. It was very easy to scrape the baggage compartment doors on tight turns. The 4905s looked just like 4108s but with three baggage compartments. In addition, synchronized gearboxes were added in the second generation.

Some 4905s were equipped with a tag axle at the factory, with a single extra wheel on each side, located in the third baggage compartment for states with lower axle load limits. The tag axle was forward of the drive axle, so turning radius was not affected.

In 1972, the PD-4108 was redesignated P8M4108A, and the PD-4905 became P8M4905A. In 1979 and 1980, the P8M4905A was replaced with the short-lived model H8H649, which added an automatic transmission from Allison for the first time.

Markets
The GM Buffalo models were purchased primarily by affiliates of the National Trailways Bus System and many other smaller operators. After the Scenicruiser exclusivity arrangement with GM, Greyhound purchased an interest in Canadian bus manufacturer Motor Coach Industries (MCI), and by the mid-1960s, it had switched most of its purchasing over to MCI products. In the 1970s, MCI products began to overtake the GM Buffalo models in sales volume, especially after the introduction of the popular MC-8 at the Transpo 72 exhibition held at Dulles Airport near Washington, DC, in 1972.

As the market share declined, GM lost interest in updating its intercity motorcoach products. When the GM RTS bus models replaced the fishbowl models in GM's transit bus offerings in 1977, the loss of shared capacity meant the Buffalo models, which shared many common parts with the fishbowl, would not continue in production for long. The final Buffalo model buses were built in 1980.

Total production of the 4,558 Buffalo buses was as follows: 

Notes

See also

GM PD-4501 Scenicruiser
GM New Look Transit Coach 
Rapid Transit Series - next transit generation bus
GMC Classic bus
GM PD-4103
 List of buses

References

External links

Scenicruiser home page
The original Scenicruiser
 Images of Buffalo Bus
 

Buses of the United States
Coaches (bus)
Double-decker buses
Buffalo bus
Vehicles introduced in 1966
Full-size buses